Jakarta Stock Exchange (JSX) (Indonesian: Bursa Efek Jakarta (BEJ)) was a stock exchange based in Jakarta, Indonesia, before it merged with the Surabaya Stock Exchange to form the Indonesia Stock Exchange.

History
Originally opened in 1912 under the Dutch colonial government, it was re-opened in 1977 after several closures during World War I and World War II. After being reopened in 1977, the exchange was under the management of the newly created Capital Market Supervisory Agency (Badan Pengawas Pasar Modal, or Bapepam), which answered to the Department of Finance. Trading activity and market capitalization grew alongside the development of Indonesia's financial markets and private sector – highlighted by a major bull run in 1990. On July 13, 1992, the exchange was privatised under the ownership of Jakarta Exchange Inc. As a result, the functions of Bapepam changed to become the Capital Market Supervisory Agency. On 22 March 1995 JSX launched the Jakarta Automated Trading System (JATS). In September 2007, Jakarta Stock Exchange and Surabaya Stock Exchange merged to form the Indonesian Stock Exchange by the Indonesian Minister of Finance.

Stock indices
Two of the primary stock market indices used to measure and report value changes in representative stock groupings are the JSX Composite and the Jakarta Islamic Index (JII). The JII was established in 2002 to act as a benchmark in measuring market activities based on Sharia (Islamic law). Currently, there are approximately 30 corporate stocks listed on the JII. The FTSE/ASEAN Indices were launched by the five ASEAN exchanges (Singapore Exchange, Bursa Malaysia, The Stock Exchange of Thailand, Jakarta Stock Exchange, The Philippine Stock Exchange) and global index provider FTSE on 21 September 2005. The indices, covering the five ASEAN markets, are designed using international standards, free float adjusted, and based on the Industry Classification Benchmark (ICB). The indices comprise FTSE/ASEAN Benchmark Index and FTSE/ASEAN 40 tradable index. The FTSE/ASEAN 40 index is calculated on a real-time basis from 9:00 a.m. and the closing index is calculated at 6:00 p.m. (Singapore time). The FTSE/ASEAN benchmark index is calculated on end-of-day basis.

Merger
Both Jakarta Stock Exchange (JSX) and the Surabaya Stock Exchange (SSX) merged to form a new entity "Indonesia Stock Exchange (Bursa Efek Indonesia).

See also
Surabaya Stock Exchange (SSX)
Jakarta Futures Exchange (JFX)
Indonesia Stock Exchange (IDX)
JSX Composite
Economy of Indonesia
List of stock exchanges
Telkom (Indonesia)
LQ-45
Matahari

Notes

External links
JSX website
IDX website

Indonesia Stock Exchange
Stock exchanges in Indonesia
Indonesian companies established in 1912
Financial services companies established in 1912
Financial services companies disestablished in 2007
Economy of Indonesia
1912 establishments in the Dutch East Indies
Defunct stock exchanges
Economy of Jakarta
2007 disestablishments in Indonesia